USS R-2 (SS-79) was an R-class coastal and harbor defense submarine of the United States Navy.

Construction and commissioning
R-2′s keel was laid down on 16 October 1917 by the Fore River Shipbuilding Company in Quincy, Massachusetts. She was launched on 23 September 1918, sponsored by Mrs. Charles M. Cooke, and commissioned at Boston, Massachusetts, on 24 January 1919 with Lieutenant Commander Charles Maynard "Savvy" Cooke, Jr., in command.

Service history
After acceptance trials in Cape Cod Bay, R-2 was assigned to Submarine Division 9 of the United States Atlantic Fleet and based at ew London, Connecticut. She departed New London on 4 December 1919 bound for Norfolk, Virginia, and winter division maneuvers in the Gulf of Mexico. Given hull classification symbol SS-79 on 17 July 1920, R-2 headed for Norfolk on 13 September 1920 for an overhaul.

R-2 was transferred to the United States Pacific Fleet on 14 April 1921, transited the Panama Canal on 28 May 1921, and arrived on 30 June 1921at her new base, San Pedro, California. She took part in fleet exercises off Central America from 5 February to 6 April 1923. Returning to San Pedro on 10 April 1923, R-2 was ordered to Hawaii on 16 July with submarine Division 9 and remained there for eight years, developing submarine tactics with the Pacific Fleet. She made an endurance cruise to Midway Atoll in the Northwestern Hawaiian Islands in July and August 1924.

Leaving Pearl Harbor, Hawaii, on 12 December 1930, R-2 was reassigned to the Atlantic Fleet and arrived at New London via the Panama Canal on 9 February 1931. She was attached to Submarine Division 4 and for the next ten years served as a training ship for the Submarine School at New London and for the Yale University Naval Reserve Officer Training Corps unit.

Assigned to Submarine Division 12 on 1 June 1941, R-2 departed New London on 16 June and arrived on 22 June 1941 at Key West, Florida, her new home port. Based there for the remainder of her career, she was attached to the Fleet Sonar School, and assigned periodically to defensive patrols in keeping with her limited operational capabilities.

On 25 August 1942, the United States Coast Guard Cutter  mistakenly opened gunfire on R-2 near Key West. R-2 sustained no damage.

In the spring of 1945, with the approach of German capitulation, R-2 was ordered to Philadelphia, Pennsylvania, for inactivation. Arriving there on 1 May 1945, she was decommissioned on 10 May 1945 and struck from the Naval Vessel Register on 2 June 1945.  She was sold to Rosoff Brothers of New York City on 28 September 1945, resold to the Northern Metals Company of Philadelphia in October 1945, and scrapped in early 1946.

References

Footnotes

Bibliography
 Blair, Clay, Jr. Silent Victory. Philadelphia: Lippincott, 1975.
 Hinman, Charles R., and Douglas E. Campbell. The Submarine Has No Friends: Friendly Fire Incidents Involving U.S. Submarines During World War II. Syneca Research Group, Inc., 2019. .

External links
 

United States R-class submarines
World War II submarines of the United States
Ships built in Quincy, Massachusetts
1918 ships
Friendly fire incidents of World War II
Maritime incidents in August 1942